William Thomas Tibbetts (born October 14, 1974) is an American former professional ice hockey player who last played for the Cape Cod Bluefins of the Federal Hockey League.

Playing career

ECHL
Tibbetts started his career in the ECHL with the Birmingham Bulls, playing two games with the team as a 19-year-old rookie during the 1994–95 season. The following season, he  signed with the Johnstown Chiefs. Tibbetts finished the season with 37 goals, 31 assists, and 68 points, ranking third on the team behind established ECHL veterans Don Parsons and Trevor Jobe. His 300 PIMs was the second highest on the team that season, finishing only behind Jason Courtemache's 363 PIMs. Because of a ruling which involved the violation of his probation, this was Tibbetts' last season of professional hockey until the year 2000.

Rape charge and prison
In 1994, Tibbetts plead guilty to rape, based on a 1992 interaction between a 17-year-old Tibbetts and a 15-year-old girl, that the convicting judge called “brutal” in nature. His sentence was suspended for 42 months. However, in 1995, while on probation for the rape case, Tibbetts was convicted of assault and battery with a dangerous weapon (a BB gun), disorderly conduct and witness intimidation. As a result, Tibbetts served 39 months in prison; the sentence on the assault and battery charges was 30 months, but it was served concurrently with the previously suspended sentence for statutory rape. As a result of the convictions, Tibbetts had to register as a sex offender and could not play games in Canada.

NHL
On August 13, 2000, Tibbetts signed a professional tryout (PTO) contract with the Pittsburgh Penguins of the NHL. He was later assigned to their AHL affiliate in Wilkes-Barre, where he  scored 38 points in 38 games before being recalled by his parent club later that season. For Tibbetts to reach the NHL, even after three and a half years of jail time and adversity, Penguins owner Mario Lemieux considered this to be "a great accomplishment" and that it was "a great story". Tibbetts spent another partial season between Wilkes-Barre and Pittsburgh before being traded to Philadelphia. On March 17, 2002, Tibbetts was traded to the Philadelphia Flyers for defensive forward and faceoff specialist Kent Manderville.

Tibbetts' tenure with the Flyers was short lived. He played nine games with the Flyers, averaging less than seven minutes a game. Tibbetts was also suspended for two games during his short tenure for instigating a fight, which resulted in his third penalty of the night. On April 9, 2002, 23 days after he was traded to Philadelphia, Tibbetts was placed on waivers. Tibbetts "did everything he was supposed to do, which included going to anger management classes", Flyers GM Bobby Clarke said. Clarke later said that he released Tibbetts because of a "numbers game", which had Tibbetts behind five centerman and Marty Murray ready to come off the IR.
Tibbetts started the 2002–03 season with the Hartford Wolfpack of the AHL. On December 16, 2002, Tibbetts  signed with the New York Rangers of the National Hockey League. In 11 games with the Rangers, he went pointless with only 12 PIMs.

Return To ECHL
On October 17, 2003, Tibbetts signed with the San Diego Gulls of the ECHL, but was later assigned to two different AHL teams during the 2003–04 ECHL season. On January 9, 2004, Tibbetts was recalled by the Springfield Falcons and returned to the team on January 23. Two months later, on March 20, 2004, he was loaned to the Houston Aeros. Both times he was returned to the Gulls due to "behavorial problems".

On October 5, 2004, Tibbetts re-signed with the San Diego Gulls, but spent time on the injured reserve (IR) list because of back problems. San Diego waived Tibbetts on November 12, 2004, citing a "zero tolerance policy because of past conduct problems". Two days later, Tibbetts was claimed off waivers by the Las Vegas Wranglers of the ECHL. Tibbetts received an indefinite suspension on November 19, 2004, due to a match penalty as a result of a highsticking penalty against Bakersfield Condors forward Todd Alexander. This was Tibbetts' first game as a member of the Las Vegas Wranglers. Tibbetts returned to the ice on December 10 after a ten-game suspension. After receiving a fourth ejection in thirteen games, Tibbetts was placed on waivers by the Wranglers. He later was claimed by the Toledo Storm, but never played a game for them. Tibbetts declined to report to the Storm and was later traded to the Idaho Steelheads for future considerations. He played fifteen games with the Steelheads, scoring three goals with eleven assists. On March 17, 2005, Tibbetts was ejected from a game against the Louisiana IceGators for not having his fight strap tied down during a fight against IceGators forward Chris Thompson. Tibbetts later went after referee Chris Ciamaga but was restrained by three Steelheads teammates. Tibbetts earned a second game misconduct and a gross misconduct for this incident, and four days later, Tibbetts was handed a second indefinite suspension of the 2004–05 ECHL season. On March 21, 2005, Tibbetts was released from the Idaho Steelheads.

Minor leagues and Europe
In 2005–06 he started the season with the Rockford Icehogs of the UHL. On December 8, 2005, Rockford Icehogs announced that they loaned Tibbetts to the Chicago Wolves of the American Hockey League.

Tibbetts reported to the 2006–07 Boston Bruins training camp as part of the "Be A Bruin" promotion, a team-approved promotion which allowed one player of each position (forward, defenseman, goalie) of various leagues to take a chance at participating in a Bruins training camp. The promotion was originally intended for amateurs who wanted a shot at playing for the Boston Bruins, but because Tibbetts was a member of the Chicago Wolves at the time, his entry (submitted by his father) would be permitted. Tibbetts reported to camp on September 9, 2006 but was released on September 18. He later signed a tryout contract with HPK of the Finnish SM-liiga. After only four games with HPK, Tibbetts left the team without notice and signed with rival HIFK.

On November 7, 2007 he signed a contract with EHC Olten of the Swiss National League B

On February 18, 2009, Tibbetts signed a three-game contract with the Huntsville Havoc of the SPHL and five days later signed a contract for the remainder of the season . Tibbetts finished his tenure with 15 points in 12 games,  and a suspendion for two games for blindsiding Columbus Cottonmouths defenseman Kyle Lundale with a punch to the head.

After a 32-month sabbatical from professional hockey, Tibbetts resumed his playing career, with the Cape Cod Bluefins of the Federal Hockey League, signing with the team on December 3, 2011. In his first game, Tibbetts scored an empty net goal and assisted on four others in a 5-4 victory over the Danbury Whalers. Tibbetts followed up his 5-point night with a three-point game where he scored a goal and two assists. He played fifteen games with the Bluefins, retiring from professional hockey thereafter.

Subsequent legal problems
Tibbetts was arrested in August 2007 for leading police on a high-speed car chase, not long after having led police on a different high speed chase earlier in 2007.

In 2019 he served 58 days for violating his probation, then pleaded guilty to two counts of criminal harassment against the Scituate police chief and the chief's sister, and one count each of violating a harassment prevention order, intimidating a witness and driving with a suspended license. Shortly after being released, he was arrested on new drug charges.

Career statistics

References

External links
 

1974 births
Bellingham Ice Hawks players
Birmingham Bulls (ECHL) players
Chicago Wolves players
Danbury Mad Hatters players
Federal Prospects Hockey League players
Hartford Wolf Pack players
HIFK (ice hockey) players
Houston Aeros (1994–2013) players
HPK players
Huntsville Havoc players
Ice hockey players from Massachusetts
Idaho Steelheads (ECHL) players
Johnstown Chiefs players
Las Vegas Wranglers players
Living people
London Knights players
New York Rangers players
People from Scituate, Massachusetts
Philadelphia Flyers players
Pittsburgh Penguins players
Rockford IceHogs (UHL) players
San Diego Gulls (ECHL) players
Sioux City Musketeers players
Sportspeople from Plymouth County, Massachusetts
Springfield Falcons players
Tri-City Americans players
Undrafted National Hockey League players
Wilkes-Barre/Scranton Penguins players
American men's ice hockey right wingers